Sunbelt Federal Credit Union (commonly referred to as SFCU) is a full-service not-for profit credit union offering financial products and services across the Pine Belt region of Southern Mississippi.

Recent press

Central Sunbelt was selected as one of the top 10 places to work in Mississippi 2016 by the Mississippi Business Journal.

Overview

Central Sunbelt was originally chartered as the Masonite Employees Federal Credit Union on October 16, 1953, and since has grown to house over 220 million dollars in assets and service over 30,000 members across the Mississippi Pine Belt region with full service financial services.

The beginnings

Masonite, a wood product fabricated for production of doors, roofing, walls, and house siding, was invented in Laurel, Mississippi, in 1924 by William H. Mason, a friend to Thomas Edison.  Mass production of masonite began shortly after in 1929 and the size of the company quickly grew with the demands of the masonite product.  The employees of Masonite soon found the need for a financial institution to service the needs of the growing employee base and established a federally chartered credit union on October 16, 1963.

Expansion

Within twenty years, the credit union that once began to serve a single company's employee base was now a multimillion-dollar financial institution serving a large part of the growing community.  The board of directors found it necessary to update the name of Masonite Employees Federal Credit Union to better adapt to the growing membership base.  The credit union name changed January 1, 1983, to Central Sunbelt Federal Credit Union, as the result of expanding the field of membership to include other employee groups. In May 1991, Central Sunbelt aimed to fit the growing needs of the membership base with a second branch in the neighboring City of Hattiesburg.  Soon after, a second office in Laurel was established on Sawmill Road in April 1995.  A fourth branch was constructed on Lincoln Road in Hattiesburg in July 2000.  In July, 2012, a fifth location was built to service McComb, in Pike County) as Central Sunbelt merged in Pike County Teachers Federal Credit Union. In January 2015, Central Sunbelt launched a new branch in Waynesboro, the seat of Wayne County, Mississippi.

In March 2019, Central Sunbelt Federal Credit Union changed its name to Sunbelt Federal Credit Union.

Current state

Today, Central Sunbelt is the third largest credit union in the state, servicing several hundred SEGs as well as those who live, work, worship, volunteer, and attend school in the expansion areas of Jones County, Pike County, Simpson County, Wayne County, and parts of Forrest, Lamar, and Convington counties.

Other credit unions who merged in to create what Central Sunbelt is today:
 Masonite Employees FCU
 Jones County School District FCU
 Black Creek FCU
 Pike County Teachers FCU
 Lamar County FCU
 Green County FCU
 Howard Employees FCU

References

 https://web.archive.org/web/20150905134006/http://creditunionaccess.com/cu08905.htm
 http://www.sunbeltfcu.org
 https://www.bloomberg.com/research/stocks/private/snapshot.asp?privcapId=113396714
 http://www.creditunionsonline.com/credit-union-4049.html#reviews
 https://web.archive.org/web/20160806075820/http://www.sunbeltfcu.org/about-csfcu.html
 https://web.archive.org/web/20160806075820/http://www.sunbeltfcu.org/about-csfcu.html
 https://web.archive.org/web/20160718001912/http://sunbeltfcu.org/membership.html
 https://web.archive.org/web/20160806015003/https://www.co-opfs.org/news/2012/central-sunbelt-fcu-joins-co-op-network,-nation%E2%80%99s-largest-credit-union-only-network-of-atms/

External links
 

Credit unions based in Mississippi